Symphony of Death  is an EP released by Grave Digger.

Track listing 
 "Intro"  
 "Symphony of Death" 
 "Back to the Roots" 
 "House of Horror"
 "Shout it Out"
 "World of Fools"
 "Wild and Dangerous"

Japanese Bonus Track 
8. "Sin City (AC/DC Cover)"

Credits 
Chris Boltendahl - Vocals
Uwe Lulis - Guitars
Thomas Göttlich - Bass
Jörg Michael - Drums, percussion

References

Grave Digger (band) EPs
1994 EPs